Hearts on Fire is an extended play by Canadian country music artist Chad Brownlee. It was released on April 29, 2016 via MDM Recordings. It includes the singles "Hearts on Fire" and "I Hate You for It".

Track listing

Chart performance

Album

Singles

References

2016 EPs
Chad Brownlee EPs
MDM Recordings albums